Satoru-kun is the title of a story told as an urban legend and the name of a character in the story. Some believe that the name "Satoru-kun" is derived from the yokai "Satori," which is a monster that reads people's minds.

Legend 
Satoru-kun can be called by phone and will answer any question you have for him.

The story being circulated is generally as follows.

Insert a 10-yen coin into a pay phone and call your cell phone. When the call is connected, the caller chants, "Satoru-kun, Satoru-kun, come here," into the phone from the receiver. and chant "Satoru-kun, Satoru-kun, come here. Satoru-kun will call your cell phone within 24 hours. When you answer the phone, Satoru-kun informs you of your current location. After several such calls, Satoru-kun will gradually approach you and finally come up behind you. At this point, Satoru-kun will answer any questions you may have. However, it is rumored that if you turn your back, Satoru-kun will take you somewhere. So far, there are rumors that he will take you to another world.

It is also said that if you ask other questions that you already know the answers to, Satoru-kun will get angry.

References 

Japanese urban legends